George H. Proffit (September 4, 1807 – September 7, 1847) was an American lawyer who served two terms as a U.S. Representative from Indiana from 1839 to 1843.

Biography
Born in New Orleans, Louisiana, Proffit completed preparatory studies.
He moved to Petersburg, Indiana, in 1828.
He engaged in mercantile pursuits in Petersburg and Portersville, Indiana.
He studied law.
He was admitted to the bar and commenced practice in Petersburg, Indiana.
He served as member of the State house of representatives in 1831, 1832, and 1836–1838.

Congress
Proffit was elected as a Whig to the Twenty-sixth and Twenty-seventh Congresses (March 4, 1839 – March 3, 1843).
He was not a candidate for renomination in 1842.

Later career and death 
He was appointed by President Tyler as Envoy Extraordinary and Minister Plenipotentiary to Brazil and served from June 7, 1843, to August 10, 1844, when he returned home, the Senate having refused to confirm his appointment.

He died in Louisville, Kentucky, September 7, 1847, and was interred in Walnut Hill Cemetery (Petersburg, Indiana).

References
 
 

1807 births
1847 deaths
Politicians from New Orleans
Ambassadors of the United States to Brazil
Members of the Indiana House of Representatives
19th-century American diplomats
Whig Party members of the United States House of Representatives from Indiana
People from Petersburg, Indiana
19th-century American politicians